Dentifovea is a genus of moths of the family Crambidae.

Species
Dentifovea fulvifascialis (Christoph, 1887)
Dentifovea praecultalis (Rebel, 1896)

References

Odontiini
Crambidae genera
Taxa named by Hans Georg Amsel